The 2010 Hokkaido Nippon-Ham Fighters season is the 65th season for the Hokkaido Nippon-Ham Fighters franchise.

Regular season

Standings

Record vs. opponents

Game log

|-align="center" bgcolor="#ffbbbb"
| 1 || March 20 || Hawks || 5–3 || Sugiuchi (1–0) || Darvish (0–1) || Mahara (1) || 42,002 || 0–1–0
|-align="center" bgcolor="#ffbbbb"
| 2 || March 21 || Hawks || 2–1 (11) || Falkenborg (1–0) || H. Takeda (0–1) || Mahara (2) || 37,125 || 0–2–0
|-align="center" bgcolor="#bbffbb"
| 3 || March 22 || Hawks || 5–16 || Kida (1–0) || Houlton (0–1) ||  || 33,021 || 1–2–0
|-align="center" bgcolor="#ffbbbb"
| 4 || March 26 || @ Marines || 1–9 || Naruse (1–1) || Yagi (0–1) ||  || 24,277 || 1–3–0
|-align="center" bgcolor="ffeeaa"
| 5 || March 27 || @ Marines || 3–3 (12) || colspan=3|Game tied after 12 innings || 27,031 || 1–3–1
|-align="center" bgcolor="#ffbbbb"
| 6 || March 28 || @ Marines || 5–6 || Ito (1–0) || H. Takeda (0–2) ||  || 23,194 || 1–4–1
|-align="center" bgcolor="#ffbbbb"
| 7 || March 30 || Buffaloes || 8–4 || Kishida (2–0) || Itokazu (0–1) ||  || 17,588 || 1–5–1
|-align="center" bgcolor="#ffbbbb"
| 8 || March 31 || Buffaloes || 3–2 || Yamamoto (1–0) || Wolfe (0–1) || Leicester (2) || 18,429 || 1–6–1
|-

|-align="center" bgcolor="#ffbbbb"
| 9 || April 2 || Lions || 6–4 || Fujita (1–0) || H. Takeda (0–3) || Sikorski (4) || 19,740 || 1–7–1
|-align="center" bgcolor="#bbffbb"
| 10 || April 3 || Lions || 1–2 || Darvish (1–1) || Hsu (0–1) || Wolfe (1) || 30,225 || 2–7–1
|-align="center" bgcolor="#ffbbbb"
| 11 || April 4 || Lions || 4–0 || Hoashi (1–1) || M. Takeda (0–1) ||  || 28,830 || 2–8–1
|-

Roster

References

Hokkaido Nippon-Ham Fighters
Hokkaido Nippon-Ham Fighters seasons